The Lyons River is a river in the Gascoyne region of Western Australia.

The headwaters of the Lyons rise just west of the Teano Range and the river flows generally south-west, joined by 36 tributaries including the Edmund River, Frederick River, Onslow Creek, Gifford Creek, Koorabooka Creek and Ulura Creek. The Lyons reaches its confluence with the Gascoyne River near the township of Gascoyne Junction near the southern end of the Kennedy Range. The river descends  over its  course.

Several permanent pools of water exist along the river including Cattle Pool, Windarrie Pool and Bubbawonnara Pool.

The Lyons River is known as Mithering by the local Aboriginal Australians, the Malgaru. The first European to come upon the river was explorer Francis Gregory in 1858. He named the river after the naval hero Admiral Sir Edmund Lyons.

See also

List of watercourses in Western Australia

References

Rivers of the Gascoyne region